George Albert Bond (11 February 1910 – 1982) was an English professional footballer. He played for Millwall and Gillingham between 1931 and 1936, making 69 appearances in the Football League, before emigrating to Malta.

References

1910 births
1982 deaths
English footballers
Gillingham F.C. players
Millwall F.C. players
Footballers from Ilford
Association football forwards